Francis Goes to the Races is a 1951 American black-and-white comedy film from Universal-International, produced by Leonard Goldstein, directed by Arthur Lubin, that stars Donald O'Connor, Piper Laurie, and Cecil Kellaway. The distinctive voice of Francis is a voice-over by actor Chill Wills.

This is a sequel to Universal-International's 1950 film Francis.

Plot
Francis the Talking Mule and his sidekick Peter Sterling visit Colonel Travers and his granddaughter on their family horse farm. Peter soon finds himself involved in the world of horse racing and a crime boss and his men trying to "fix" races involving the Travers' horses.

Cast
Donald O'Connor as Peter Stirling
Piper Laurie as Frances Travers
Cecil Kellaway as Colonel Travers
Jesse White as Frank Damer
Barry Kelley as 'Square Deal' Mallory
Hayden Rorke as Rogers
Vaughn Taylor as Harrington
Larry Keating as Head Steward

Production
Francis had been a success, and in May 1950 Universal announced they had bought the film rights to David Stern's character Francis. These included rights to his 1948 novel Francis Goes to Washington and to any other Francis books that he may write. Universal could make an unlimited number of film sequels and use the character for TV, radio, and commercials. For these rights Stern was paid a reported $60,000.

Francis Goes to Washington was meant to be the first sequel. However, the filming of Washington was postponed as there were "too many complications" for the film "to be made as things stand at the present." As a result the film was never made.

The production of Francis Goes to the Races was then announced in October 1950. Production started November 1950. The film was shot at Santa Anita racecourse. Hill Prince, Coaltown, and Moonrush were among the real life horses who appeared in the film.

Reception
The Washington Post called the film "smooth and cheery".

Video releases
The original film, Francis (1950), was released in 1978 as one of the first-ever titles in the new LaserDisc format, DiscoVision Catalog #22-003. It was then re-issued on LaserDisc in May 1994 by MCA/Universal Home Video (Catalog #: 42024) as part of an Encore Edition Double Feature with Francis Goes to the Races (1951).

The first two Francis films were released again in 2004 by Universal Pictures on Region 1 and Region 4 DVD, along with the next two in the series, as The Adventures of Francis the Talking Mule Vol. 1. Several years later, Universal released all 7 Francis films as a set on three Region 1 and Region 4 DVDs, Francis The Talking Mule: The Complete Collection.

References

External links

1951 films
1950s fantasy comedy films
American black-and-white films
Films directed by Arthur Lubin
American horse racing films
Universal Pictures films
Films scored by Frank Skinner
American fantasy comedy films
1951 comedy films
Films about donkeys
1950s English-language films
1950s American films
Races